Nurses Registration Act may refer to:
 Nurses Registration Act 1901 of the Parliament of New Zealand
 Nurses Registration Act 1919 of the Parliament of the United Kingdom